The Australia women's cricket team played the Pakistan women's cricket team in Malaysia in October 2018. The tour consisted of three Women's One Day Internationals (WODIs) and three Women's Twenty20 Internationals (WT20Is). The WODI games were part of the 2017–20 ICC Women's Championship. It was the first women's bilateral series were played in Malaysia, with all the matches were played at the Kinrara Academy Oval. Australia women won both the WODI and WT20I series 3–0.

Squads

WODI series

1st WODI

2nd WODI

3rd WODI

WT20I series

1st WT20I

2nd WT20I

3rd WT20I

Notes

References

External links
 Series home at ESPN Cricinfo

2017–20 ICC Women's Championship
Malaysia 2018
2018 in Pakistani cricket
International cricket competitions in 2018–19
Pakistan women's national cricket team
International cricket competitions in Malaysia
Pakistan
2018 in women's cricket
October 2018 sports events in Malaysia